NGC 4454 is a barred spiral galaxy located about 123 million light-years away in the constellation of Virgo. NGC 4454 was discovered by astronomer William Herschel on April 17, 1784.

See also 
 List of NGC objects (4001–5000)
 NGC 4314

References

External links 
 

Barred spiral galaxies
Virgo (constellation)
4454
41083
7606
Astronomical objects discovered in 1784